is a Japanese manga series written and illustrated by Shingo Honda. It was serialized in Monthly Shōnen Champion from April 2010 to June 2017 and published in 21 volumes.

Media

Manga
Written and illustrated by Shingo Honda, the series began serialization in Monthly Shōnen Champion on April 6, 2010. The series completed its serialization on June 6, 2017. The series' individual chapters were collected into 21 tankōbon volumes.

Media Do published the series in English digitally.

Volume list

Other media
A two-minute live action short was produced to commemorate the release of the seventh volume. It was created by Hajime Ohata and Kiyotaka Taguchi.

Reception
The reviewers for Anime News Network offered praise to the artwork and concept of the series, while also criticizing the plot as generic and uninspired. Koiwai from Manga News had similar feelings, praising the artwork and criticizing the plot as generic.

The series has sold over one million copies.

References

External links
 

Akita Shoten manga
Horror anime and manga
Shōnen manga